The following list includes notable people who were born or have lived in Peoria, Illinois.

For a similar list organized alphabetically by last name, see the category page People from Peoria, Illinois.

Authors and academics 

 Dorothy Cannell, mystery author
 William Lane Craig, Christian apologist
 Philip José Farmer, science fiction and fantasy author
 Betty Friedan, feminist author (The Feminine Mystique)
 Kendall Gott, author and historian; grew up in Peoria
 Joseph C. Hafele, physicist
 Kent Hovind, Christian creationist; convicted of 58 federal counts involving money fraud
 Kate Klise, children's book author
 Dan Simmons, author (Hyperion Cantos series)

Business and engineering 

 Bruce Borland, golf course designer for Jack Nicklaus; died in a 1999 plane crash with Hall of Famer Payne Stewart
 John Coleman, meteorologist and weatherman; founder of The Weather Channel
 Harry Frazee, owner of Boston Red Sox who traded Babe Ruth to the New York Yankees
 Joseph B. Greenhut, merchant
 Susan G. Komen, namesake of Susan G. Komen for the Cure
 George D. Sax, entrepreneur; credited with the innovation of drive-through banking

Media and arts 

 
 Richard Pryor, comedian and actor 
 Mark Staff Brandl, artist
 Charles Correll, performer (Amos and Andy radio show)
 Mariclare Costello, actress
 Lee Garmes, cinematographer
 Harry Harrison, radio host, disc jockey
 Teck Holmes, actor, rapper, former Direct Effect host; The Real World: Hawaii cast member
 Tom Irwin, actor; founding member of the Steppenwolf Theatre Company
 Jim and Marian Jordan, radio performers (Fibber McGee and Molly)
 Tami Lane, makeup artist; Academy Award winner for The Chronicles of Narnia: The Lion, the Witch and the Wardrobe
 Camryn Manheim, actress
 Kathryn McGuire, actress
 James Millhollin, character actor; born in Peoria
 Bill Ballance, radio host
 David Ogden Stiers, actor (Major Charles Emerson Winchester III on M*A*S*H)
 Cynthia Stone, actress
 Sander Vanocur, television news journalist
 Marty Wombacher, writer, photojournalist, blogger
 Adam Tod Brown, comedian and podcaster

Music 

 Dan Fogelberg, musician
 Jerry Hadley, opera tenor
 Bruce Johnston, member of the Beach Boys; born in Peoria, then adopted and moved to Chicago and Los Angeles
 Julia H. Johnston, Christian songwriter who composed Grace Greater Than All Our Sin
 Tim Kelley, recipient of Key To The City of Peoria; Grammy Award-winning record producer; half of the production duo Tim & Bob
 Cristy Lane, singer
 Elaine "Spanky" McFarlane, lead singer for Spanky and Our Gang; replaced Cass Elliot in The Mamas & the Papas
 Craig Moore, lead singer and bassist of 1960s garage rock band Gonn; grew up in Peoria
 Abbie Parker, member of the contemporary Christian music band I Am They
 Gary Richrath, guitarist from REO Speedwagon; raised in East Peoria
 Bob Robinson, recipient of Key To The City of Peoria; Grammy Award-winning record producer; half of the production duo Tim & Bob
 Bart Shatto, featured vocalist with Trans-Siberian Orchestra
 Fred Stobaugh, 96-year-old widower; wrote a love letter that became the viral video "Oh Sweet Lorraine"
 Greg X. Volz, lead singer of Christian rock band Petra
 Richard A. Whiting, composer

Bands 

 The Forecast, indie rock band
 Minsk, metal band
 Mudvayne, metal band
 Planes Mistaken for Stars, punk and hardcore band

Military 

 General Wayne A. Downing, US Special Operations Commander and Joint Special Operations Commander; 75th Ranger Regiment
 General John M. Shalikashvili, former Chairman of the Joint Chiefs of Staff
 Frank Wead, US Navy aviator turned screenwriter; early promoter of US Naval aviation

Politics and law 

 Prescott E. Bloom, Illinois state senator
 Nancy Brinker, founder of Susan G. Komen for the Cure; Chief of Protocol of the United States; U.S. Ambassador to Hungary
 Jefferson R. Boulware, Illinois state representative and lawyer
 Robert L. Burhans, Illinois state legislator and lawyer
 John Edward Cassidy, Illinois Attorney General
 Mark Clark, Black Panther; killed in infamous Chicago police raid in 1969
 Joseph E. Daily, Chief Justice of Illinois Supreme Court
 William L. Eagleton, US diplomat
 Sherman W. Eckley, legislator and businessman
 Susan Fargo, Massachusetts state senator
 Colonel Robert G. Ingersoll, controversial orator; Illinois Attorney General
 Garrett D. Kinney, state treasurer
 Raja Krishnamoorthi, Representative of Illinois's 8th congressional district
 Ray LaHood, Representative of Illinois's 18th congressional district; Secretary of Transportation under President Obama
 James B. McCoy, Wisconsin state legislator
 Robert H. Michel, longest-serving Republican leader of US House of Representatives
 Robert Dale Morgan, US federal judge and mayor of Peoria
 Norman H. Purple, Illinois Supreme Court justice and lawyer
 Don Saltsman, state legislator
 Aaron Schock, former US Congressman
 Robert Scholes, state legislator and lawyer
 Fred J. Schraeder, IIllinois state legislator and businessman
 Daniel R. Sheen, Illinois state legislator and lawyer
 David Sills, former mayor of Irvine, California and son-in-law to President Ronald Reagan
 LeRoy Smallenberger, lawyer, judge, state chairman of Louisiana Republican Party 1960-64
 Hudson R. Sours, Illinois state legislator
 Clyde E. Stone, Chief Justice of Illinois Supreme Court
 Fred J. Tuerk, Illinois state legislator
 Hubert W. Woodruff, Illinois state legislator and lawyer

Religion 

 Rabbi David Hirsch, Rosh Yeshiva of Rabbi Isaac Elchanan Theological Seminary, an affiliate of Yeshiva University
 Julia H. Johnston, Christian songwriter who composed Grace Greater Than All Our Sin
 William Lane Craig, Christian apologist and philosopher
 Archbishop Fulton J. Sheen, bishop of Rochester and host of The Catholic Hour on radio and Life is Worth Living

Sports

Auto racing
Irv Hoerr, IMSA sports car racing champion

Baseball 

 Amy Irene Applegren, pitcher and infielder in All-American Girls Professional Baseball League
 Charlie Bartson, pitcher for Chicago Pirates
 Harry Bay, outfielder for Cincinnati Reds and Cleveland Bronchos/Naps
 Lynn Brenton, pitcher for Cleveland Indians and Cincinnati Reds
 Ben Caffyn, outfielder for Cleveland Naps
 Mike Donlin, outfielder for several Major League Baseball teams
 Dan Dugdale, catcher for Kansas City Cowboys and Washington Senators
 Elizabeth Farrow, pitcher in All-American Girls Professional Baseball League
 Norwood Gibson, pitcher for Boston Americans
 Tom Gilles, pitcher for Toronto Blue Jays
 June Gilmore, outfielder in All-American Girls Professional Baseball League
 Joe Girardi, MLB catcher and manager of New York Yankees, 3-time World Series champion,raised in East Peoria
 Irene Kerwin, catcher in All-American Girls Professional Baseball League, born in Peoria, member of three Halls of Fame
 Esther Lyman, catcher in All-American Girls Professional Baseball League, born in Peoria
 Chris Mabeus, pitcher for Milwaukee Brewers
 Zach McAllister, pitcher for Cleveland Indians, raised in Chillicothe, Illinois
 Zach Monroe, pitcher for New York Yankees
 Darby O'Brien, outfielder for New York Metropolitans and Brooklyn Bridegrooms/Grooms; born in Peoria
 Leo Schrall, baseball head coach at Bradley University
 Allyn Stout, pitcher for St. Louis Cardinals, Cincinnati Reds, New York Giants, and Boston Braves; born in Peoria
 Lee Thomas, All-Star player for six MLB teams, general manager of Philadelphia Phillies; born in Peoria
 Jim Thome, first baseman for Chicago White Sox, Cleveland Indians and other teams; born and raised in Peoria
 Walter Thornton, outfielder and pitcher for Chicago Cubs
 Bill Tuttle, center fielder for three MLB teams; born and raised in Cramer, 18 miles west of Peoria
 Pete Vonachen, owner of Peoria Chiefs minor league club; born and raised in Peoria
 George Whiteman, outfielder for Boston Americans, New York Yankees and Boston Red Sox; World Series champion (1918); born in Peoria
 Ben Zobrist, 2nd baseman for Chicago Cubs, World Series Champion (2016), voted MVP; born in Peoria

Basketball 

 Acie Earl, power forward selected by Boston Celtics with 19th overall pick in 1993 NBA draft
 Ray Giacoletti, head coach, University of Utah, Drake, Eastern Washington, North Dakota State
 AJ Guyton, point guard selected by Chicago Bulls with 32nd overall pick in 2000 NBA draft
 Charlotte Lewis, 1976 Olympic silver medalist, ISU sports Hall of Fame
 Shaun Livingston, guard for NBA champion Golden State Warriors, 4th overall pick in 2004 NBA draft
 Sergio McClain, NBA D-League forward for Asheville Altitude and University of Illinois
 Carla McGhee, basketball forward, gold medalist at 1996 Summer Olympics
 Howard Nathan, point guard for Atlanta Hawks
 Brian Randle, power forward for University of Illinois and Euroleague team Maccabi Tel Aviv B.C.
 Jamar Smith, guard for Euroleague team Limoges CSP
 J. R. Koch, professional basketball player
 Dick Versace, head coach for Detroit Pistons and Indiana Pacers; NBA executive; head coach for Bradley University basketball in Peoria
 Frank Williams, point guard for University of Illinois, 25th overall pick in 2002 NBA draft

Ice skating 

 Matt Savoie, Olympic figure skater; bronze medalist (2006)

Football 

 Darryl Ashmore, offensive tackle for Los Angeles/St. Louis Rams, Oakland Raiders and Washington Redskins; cousin of Carla McGhee
 Dick Jauron, NFL defensive back, head coach for Buffalo Bills and Chicago Bears
 Sherrick McManis, cornerback for Chicago Bears
 Jeff Monken, football head coach for Army
 Tim Simpson, offensive guard for Pittsburgh Steelers; raised in East Peoria
 Mike Zimmer, head coach for Minnesota Vikings
Kendrick Green , offensive guard for Illinois and current center for the Pittsburgh Steelers

Sports media 

 Jack Brickhouse, broadcaster; radio-TV announcer of the Chicago Cubs
 Ralph Lawler, broadcaster; radio-TV announcer of the Los Angeles Clippers
 Jack Quinlan, broadcaster, radio announcer of the Chicago Cubs
 Lyall Smith, sports columnist, editor and PR director of the Detroit Lions, alumnus of Bradley University
 Charley Steiner, broadcaster, radio-TV announcer of the Los Angeles Dodgers, alumnus of Bradley University
 Rick Telander, sports columnist for the Chicago Sun-Times; panelist on Sportswriters on TV

Tennis 

 Jeff Salzenstein, tennis player

Track
Herbert Jamison, sprinter

Swimming 

 Amanda Adkins, swimmer who competed in the 2000 Summer Olympics

References

Peoria, Illinois
Peoria